or Kim Duk (born February 7, 1948) is a retired Zainichi-Korean professional wrestler, better known under his ring name . He was also known by the name Tiger Chung Lee in the World Wrestling Federation.

Early life
Masanori Toguchi was a basketball player and jūdōka during his high school days. After graduation, he joined the Japan Pro Wrestling Alliance dojo with the recommendation from Kintaro Ohki. Since Seiji Sakaguchi, another jūdōka, joined the JWA during the same time, it caused a conflict between the jūdō and puroresu industries. Toguchi was sent to South Korea for half a year with "special training" as an excuse until the issue died out.

Wrestling career

1960s–1970s
Masanori Toguchi debuted for Japan Pro Wrestling Alliance on August 30, 1968, against future NJPW referee Katsuhisa Shibata. During his rookie year, he was also trained by Karl Gotch. In his days in JWA, he was Ohki's student. When JWA folded in 1972, Toguchi went to the United States, where he developed himself as a heel under his Korean real name, Kim Duk. He spent the next four years roaming around NWA territories and in the American Wrestling Association. In 1976, he returned to Japan for All Japan Pro Wrestling, while wrestling for the NWA's Mid-Atlantic territory in the States. He was managed by Boris Malenko in the Mid-Atlantic area, often teaming with another Malenko protege, The Masked Superstar. During his Mid-Atlantic run, Duk had a short-lived feud with then-reigning Mid-Atlantic Heavyweight Champion Wahoo McDaniel. In AJPW, he had a heated rivalry with Jumbo Tsuruta. In 1979, he would defect to International Wrestling Enterprise, before defecting to New Japan Pro-Wrestling in 1981.

1980s–1990s
In 1982, Kim Duk began wrestling for the NWA's Kansas City territory, before moving to the World Wrestling Federation in 1983 under the name Tiger Chung Lee. After leaving the WWF in 1988, he went back to the Kim Duk name and wrestled for World Wrestling Council in Puerto Rico. Upon his return to Japan in 1991, he balanced wrestling for various promotions including New Japan Pro-Wrestling between 1991 and 1992, W*ING between 1992 and 1993, and WAR in 1994. Between 1993 and 1994, he would wrestle in Mexico for Universal Wrestling Association under the name YAMATO. By 1995, he was winding down his career.

2000s–2020s
In 2001, Kim Duk made his return to AJPW, helping out the promotion during their crisis after the Pro Wrestling Noah exodus.

Kim Duk had since remained semi-retired and works for a non-profit organization. He still wrestles on special legends matches from time to time. Since 2007, he has been running Wrestle-Aid. His last match as a full-time wrestler was on May 6, 2011, in a tag team match, teaming with Raideen against Masaru Toi and Red Tiger.

On June 10, 2018, at the age of 70, he won the WEW Heavyweight Championship defeating Daisaku Shimoda at a show for Pro Wrestling A-Team in Tokyo, Japan. He lost the title back to Shimoda on January 19, 2019.

In September 2019, Kim Duk pulled out of Tokyo Championship Wrestling's (TCW) tour due to chest pains, which ended up being arrhythmia. In December 2019, he flew to Cleveland, Ohio in the United States to undergo surgery at the Cleveland Clinic to put a catheter in his heart. In February 2020, TCW held a benefit show to help pay for his surgery.

Acting career
In 1986, while wrestling in the U.S. for the WWF, Kim Duk made his acting debut as a henchman of Charles Dance's character, Sardo Numspa, in The Golden Child, which starred Eddie Murphy. Two years later, he portrayed a Georgian mobster named Andrei 'The Mongol Hippie' in the Arnold Schwarzenegger film, Red Heat. A year later, he acted in two more films, Blind Fury starring Rutger Hauer, and Cage, starring Lou Ferrigno. In 2012, after a long hiatus from acting, Kim Duk portrayed Lee in the film, Mountain Mafia.

Championships and accomplishments
All Japan Pro Wrestling
NWA International Tag Team Championship (1 time) – with Kintaro Ohki
Champion Carnival Fighting Spirit Award (1980)
World's Strongest Tag Determination Fair Play Award (1977) – with Kintaro Ohki
World's Strongest Tag Determination Effort Award (1978) – with Kintaro Ohki
World's Strongest Tag Determination Team Play Award (1979) – with Kintaro Ohki
Central States Wrestling
NWA Central States Tag Team Championship (1 time) – with Yasu Fuji
NWA Tri-State
NWA United States Tag Team Championship (Tri-State version) (1 time)  – with Stan Kowalski
Pro Wrestling A-Team
WEW Heavyweight Championship (1 time)
Tokyo Sports
Fighting Spirit Award (1978)
Universal Wrestling Association
UWA World Heavyweight Championship (2 times)
World Wrestling Council
WWC Caribbean Heavyweight Championship (2 times)

Lucha de Apuesta record

References

1948 births
Japanese male film actors
Japanese male professional wrestlers
Living people
Male actors from Tokyo
Sportspeople from Tokyo
Zainichi Korean people
Stampede Wrestling alumni
20th-century professional wrestlers
21st-century professional wrestlers
WEW Heavyweight Champions
UWA World Heavyweight Champions